Berry Ring (also known as Bury Ring) is an Iron Age hillfort in Staffordshire, England, lying some two miles southwest of the county town of Stafford, a mile to the southwest of Stafford Castle and  half a mile to the west of the M6 motorway.

Description
It is a univallate hillfort, roughly oval in shape, on the northern part of elevated land north of the village of Billington.

The original entrance is thought to be in the south; its features are unclear because of sand and gravel extraction in recent times. There are other later entrances.

There is a spring-fed pond within the fort at the north-east side. There have been chance finds around the interior of flints, Iron Age pottery and medieval pottery.

References

External links
 Berry Ring, Staffordshire
 Berry Ring, Roman Britain
 An image of Berry Ring from 1926
 Images and a map of the area

Hill forts in Staffordshire
Iron Age sites in England
Scheduled monuments in Staffordshire
Borough of Stafford